The Battle of Shopian took place on 5 July 1819 between an expeditionary force from the Sikh Empire and Jabbar Khan, the governor of the Kashmir Valley province of the Durrani Empire. It was the decisive battle during the Sikh expedition into Kashmir in 1819.

Background 
From 1814 to 1819, the Sikh Empire was forced to send successive punitive expeditions against the hill states of Bhimber, Rajauri, Poonch, Nurpur, and others. By subduing rebellions in these states, the Sikh Empire was attempting to keep control of the routes through the Pir Panjal range and into Kashmir. However the Durrani Empire kept de facto control of the areas because the Pir Panjal Range blocked supplies and fresh troops to the Sikh armies.

After the death of Fateh Khan Wazir in 1818, governor Azim Khan left Kashmir for Kabul to assume Wazir's office, leaving Jabbar Khan incharge of Kashmir. Birbal Dhar, Azim Khan's revenue minister, traveled to Lahore, the capital of the Sikh Empire, and asked Maharaja Ranjit Singh to annex Kashmir from the Durrani Empire as the Afghan rule was very unpopular among the people of Kashmir.

1819 Kashmir expedition 
The Sikh expeditionary force established two armories for the expedition at Gujrat and Wazirabad. On 20 April, Ranjit Singh ordered his men from Lahore to the hill states at the foot of the Pir Panjal range. The expedition was split into three columns: Misr Diwan Chand commanded the advance force of about 12,000 with heavy artillery where Kharak Singh and Hari Singh Nalwa marched behind him, and Ranjit Singh commanded the rear guard, protecting the supply train. The expeditionary force marched to Bhimber and resupplied, capturing the fort of a local Hakim without resistance. On 1 May, both columns of the Sikh Army reached Rajouri and its ruler, Raja Agarullah Khan, rebelled and forced a battle. Hari Singh Nalwa took command of a force and routed his army, which offered an unconditional surrender after losing most of its men and war supplies. His brother, Raja Rahimullah Khan, was appointed the Raja of Rajauri in return for assistance in navigating the 'Behram Pass' (Baramgala, the lower end of the Pir Panjal Pass).

Once the Sikh forces reached the Behram Pass, the Durrani-appointed faujdar charged with guarding it fled to Srinagar. Mir Mohammad Khan, the kotwal of Poonch, and  Mohammad Ali, the kotwal of Shopian, attempted a defense at the Dhaki Deo and Maja passes but were defeated and surrendered to Misr Diwan Chand on 23 June 1819. Kharak Singh now advanced to Surdee Thana. while Misr Diwan Chand split his force into three divisions and ordered them to cross the Pir Panjal Range through different passes.

Battle 
The army regrouped at Surai Ali on the road to Shopian. On 5 July 1819, the Sikh army attempted to march through Shopian to Srinagar but was stopped by a Durrani army headed by Jabbar Khan. The Durrani force had heavily entrenched itself in preparation for the Sikh artillery attack and brought heavy artillery, which the Sikhs were unprepared for because they had brought only light guns.

Once his artillery was in range, Misr Diwan Chand opened the battle with an artillery barrage and multiple infantry and cavalry charges. The Durrani army was able to hold back the Sikh attempts to storm their lines until the Sikhs began moving their guns forward. However, when Misr Diwan Chand was overseeing the movement of guns on the Sikh left flank, Jabbar Khan saw an opening and led the Durrani right flank which stormed Misr Diwan Chand's artillery battery, captured two guns, and threw the Sikh left flank in "disarray". However the Durrani force attacking the Sikh left flank was exposed from their left and Akali Phoola Singh, the commander of the Sikh right flank, rallied his troops and led his command in a charge across the battlefield to the artillery battery. After a close quarters fight which resulted in both sides resorting to using swords and daggers, the Durrani soldiers proved to be ineffective against the much superior martial skills of the Sikh soldiers and sections of the Durrani force began to retreat and Jabbar Khan was wounded while escaping the battlefield. On 15 July 1819, the Sikh army made their way into Srinagar.

Aftermath 
Jabbar Khan and his army fled from the battlefield to Muzaffarbad but were turned away by the governor, then fleeing to Peshawar and finally to Kabul. When the Sikh army entered the city of Srinagar after the battle, Prince Kharak Singh guaranteed the personal safety of every citizen and ensured the city was not plundered. The peaceful capture of Srinagar was important as Srinagar, besides having a large Shawl-making industry, was also the center of trade between Panjab, Tibet, Iskardo, and Ladakh.

After taking Srinagar, the Sikh army faced no major opposition in conquering Kashmir. However, when Ranjit Singh installed Moti Ram, the son of Dewan Mokham Chand, as the new governor of Kashmir, he also sent a "large body of troops" with him to ensure tribute from strongholds within Kashmir that might attempt to resist Sikh rule. The capture of Kashmir set the boundaries and borders of the Sikh Empire with Tibet. The conquest of Kashmir marked an "extensive addition" to the Sikh Empire and "significantly" increased the empire's revenue and landmass.

Notes

References

Bibliography 

 

Conflicts in 1819
Sikh Empire
Battles involving the Sikhs
Shopian